Martina Zubčić (born June 3, 1989 in Zagreb) is a Croatian taekwondo athlete, who competed in the Women's 57 kg class at the 2008 Summer Olympics held in Beijing, China. She won the bronze medal.

References 

Living people
Croatian female taekwondo practitioners
Olympic taekwondo practitioners of Croatia
Olympic bronze medalists for Croatia
Taekwondo practitioners at the 2008 Summer Olympics
1989 births
Franjo Bučar Award winners
Sportspeople from Zagreb
Olympic medalists in taekwondo
Medalists at the 2008 Summer Olympics
European champions for Croatia
Universiade medalists in taekwondo
Universiade bronze medalists for Croatia
European Taekwondo Championships medalists
Medalists at the 2009 Summer Universiade
21st-century Croatian women